British nationalism asserts that the British are a nation and promotes the cultural unity of Britons, in a definition of Britishness that may include people of English, Scottish, Welsh and Northern Irish descent. British nationalism is closely associated with British unionism, which seeks to uphold the political union that is the United Kingdom, or strengthen the links between the countries of the United Kingdom.

History

British nationalism's unifying identity was developed by the ancient Britons who dwelt on the island of Great Britain. British nationalism grew to include people outside Great Britain, in Ireland, because of the 1542 Crown of Ireland Act, which declared that the crown of Ireland was to be held by the ruling monarch of England as well as Anglo-Irish calls for unity with Britain.

Modern
British nationalism is characterised as a "powerful but ambivalent force in British politics". In its moderate form, British nationalism has been a civic nationalism, emphasizing both cohesion and diversity of the people of the United Kingdom, its dependencies, and its former colonies. However, nativist nationalism has arisen based on fear of Britain being swamped by immigrants; this anti-immigrant nativist nationalism has manifested politically in the British National Party (BNP) and other nativist nationalist movements. Politicians, such as former British Prime Minister David Cameron, have sought to promote British nationalism as a progressive cause.

See also
 Brexit
 British Israelism
 Ethnic nationalism

References

Notes

Bibliography

External links

UK National Democrats- A Manifesto for Britain
British Nationalism: an idea whose time has come- BNP Manifesto 1997
Rebuilding British Democracy- BNP Manifesto 2005